The Ons Island is the main island of a small archipelago in the Ria de Pontevedra in Galicia, Spain. Ons belongs administratively to the municipality of Bueu, which has a regular ferry boat connection to the island, as have the mainland towns of Portonovo, Sanxenxo, Marín and Aldán. In 2020, lightning due to Subtropical Storm Alpha started a forest fire.

Description 
Its beaches are crystal clear and there are several routes that lead to the lighthouse, or to the Buraco do Inferno. The island has the only sustainable campsite in Galicia, with camping, cabin rental and glamping services.

Melide beach is located in the north of the island. It was one of the first nudist beaches in Galicia and can be reached by a two-kilometre path from the island's town centre.

Conservation
In 2001 the European Union designated Ons a Special Protection Area for bird-life.

In 2002, along with several other archipelagos off the Pontevedra coast, Ons became part of the Atlantic Islands of Galicia National Park.

Sights

References

Related articles 
 Ria de Pontevedra

External links 
Island info
 Island Info

Cies Islands
Cies Islands
Special Protection Areas of Spain
Islands of Galicia (Spain)
Landforms of Galicia (Spain)